Muslim Community Center is a mosque located in Chicago, Illinois. It was established in 1969 and is one of the oldest mosques in the city of Chicago.

See also
List of Mosques in Illinois
Islam in the United States
Timeline of Islamic history
 List of mosques in the Americas
 Lists of mosques
 List of mosques in the United States

References

External links

Mosques in Illinois
Religious buildings and structures in Chicago
Mosques completed in 1969